is a performance of reciting a Japanese poem or a Chinese poem read in Japanese, each poem ( shi) usually chanted ( gin) by an individual or in a group.  Reciting can be done loudly before a large audience, softly to a few friends, or quietly to the reciter themselves.

Each reciting is also termed gin. Any forms of Japanese and Chinese poetry are used for reciting.

Kanshi and classical Chinese poems are usually composed of four or more lines of Chinese characters, or kanji, each line having the same number of characters. There is strictly only one standard melody, although many poems will be distinguished by minor variations from this theme.

In Vietnam, "Shigin" (詩吟) exists under the name of "Thơ Ngâm" (詩吟).

Performance
Members of a shigin group will usually gather to train in a washitsu, or Japanese-style room with tatami matting.  Participants kneel in the lotus or seiza position, thought to be the optimum posture to allow strong and steady projection during chanting.  They are encouraged to focus their energy in their gut (thought in Zen to be the locus of power) and sing by slowly expelling this energy.  Conversely, singing from the chest, as would be encouraged in classical Western operatic style, is deemed unauthentic.

During practice, members may refer to the written gin to aid memory.  This is usually annotated, with marks to the right of each character denoting how the tone should vary through the length of its vocalisation.

Breathing intervals are indicated by right-angular strokes to the left of the character (a typical gin will last approximately one and a half minutes, in four breaths).  Finally, because Japanese and Chinese word orders differ, further (sino) numerical marks to the left of some characters indicate their correct sequence.

Gin are formally performed standing, and from memory.  Because of this, recital of longer gin is sometimes seen as more accomplished (being harder to remember, and more likely to vary from the standard melodic form).  The vocal may be accompanied by traditional Japanese instruments such as the Koto or Shakuhachi.  Dress may be Western (suit) or traditional (kimono or yukata).

Gin are also used in the performance of certain Japanese dances, such as kenshibu.  In such cases, gin may either be performed live or played from recordings.

Melody

History 
Shigin are thought to have originated in China early in the first millennium AD, and may have entered Japan amongst other texts brought back from China in the 5th century.  They were most likely sung originally in Chinese, but were later given Japanese readings, which are used in their contemporary recital.  New gin were written, often detailing particular Japanese concepts or events, but the standard written layout has remained.

Shigin are thus significantly older than other, more popular Japanese poetry forms, such as Haiku.  Their practice is now a minority art, mostly confined to the elderly and little known amongst younger generations.  Nevertheless, several Shigin festivals are held throughout the year, including the Autumn Shigin Festival (秋吟会) in Shiogama and Shinjo, in the North-East (Tōhoku) region of Japan.  Gin are also sung at Buddhist ceremonies and quasi-religious gatherings in Japan.

Moreover, although largely in anonymity, Shigin continue to have a significant influence on Japanese culture.  Individual poems are often studied in Japanese textbooks, and are regularly displayed at exhibitions of Japanese calligraphy. 

From 2013 onwards, a Japanese fusion band called Wagakki Band began to be active and quickly became popular nationwide and online. The band incorporates shigin, vocaloid, wagakki (traditional Japanese instruments) and rock elements and the vocalist, Suzuhana Yuuko, is a shigin master and utilises shigin technique in performances with the ambition to raise interest among the youth and around the world. Some of their songs contain a section of shigin.

Examples
The example below is a tanka about Mount Iwate by Japanese poet Takuboku Ishikawa (1886 – 1912, :ja:石川啄木#代表歌), with Japanese pronunciation shown in parentheses

The second example is a Kanshi poem by Japanese educator Tanso Hirose (1782 – 1856, :ja:広瀬淡窓#史跡), who encouraged his students to live together as well as study together at his institution in Kyushu:

The third example below illustrates a typical gin from Chinese poet Zhang Ji (8th century), written in the original Chinese, and in Japanese (as written and pronounced in parentheses):

(NB: Subject terms have been added to give a sense to the poem, but no such terms exist in the original Chinese.)

See also
 Poetry reading

Notes
 Yomiuri Shinbun article
www.shigin.com (in Japanese)
判り易い詩の吟じ方 (Wakari-yasui Shi no Ginjikata) - Japanese Shigin manual

References

External links 
2005 Hisho Shigin festival: audio (Japanese) - click on entries to hear recital (RealAudio required)
Chinese recital (in Chinese) - comparison: Chinese performance of Night mooring at the maple bridge (NB. not in Shigin form)

Performing arts in Japan
Chinese poetry forms
Japanese poetry
Articles containing Japanese poems